Agricultural Bank of China (ABC), also known as AgBank, is one of the "Big Four" banks in China. It was founded on 10 July 1951, and has its headquarters in Dongcheng District, Beijing. It has branches throughout mainland China, Hong Kong, London, Tokyo, New York, Frankfurt, Sydney, Seoul, and Singapore.

ABC has 320 million retail customers,  corporate clients, and nearly 24,000 branches. It is China's third-largest lender by assets. ABC went public in mid-2010, fetching the world's biggest ever initial public offering (IPO) at the time, since overtaken by the Saudi Arabian state-run petroleum enterprise, Saudi Aramco. In 2011, it ranked eighth among the Top 1000 World Banks, by 2015, it ranked third in Forbes' 13th annual Global 2000 list and in 2017 it ranked fifth. It is considered a systemically important bank by the Financial Stability Board.

History
Since the establishment of the People's Republic of China in 1949, ABC has been formed and abolished several times. On July 10, 1951, two banks of the Republic of China, Farmers Bank of China and Cooperation Bank, merged to form the Agricultural Cooperation Bank, which ABC regards as its ancestor. However, the bank was merged into People's Bank of China, the central bank in 1952. The first bank bearing the name Agricultural Bank of China was founded in 1955, but it was merged into the central bank in 1957. In 1963 the Chinese government formed another agricultural bank which was also merged into the central bank two years later. Today's Agricultural Bank of China was founded in February 1979. It was restructured to form a holding company called Agricultural Bank of China Limited. It was listed on the Shanghai and Hong Kong stock exchanges in July 2010.

In April 2007, ABC was the victim of the largest bank theft in Chinese history. This occurred when two vault managers at the Handan branch of the bank in Hebei province embezzled almost  yuan (US$7.5 million).

In 2012, ABC started a project to migrate to the Avaloq Banking System.

During the 2013 Korean crisis, the Agricultural Bank of China halted business with a North Korean bank accused by the United States of financing Pyongyang's missile and nuclear programs.

2010 initial public offering
ABC was the last of the "big four" banks in China to go public. In 2010, A shares and H shares of Agricultural Bank of China were listed on the Shanghai Stock Exchange and the Hong Kong Stock Exchange respectively. Each share was set to cost between 2.7RMB and 3.3RMB per share. H shares were set to cost between HK$2.88 and HK$3.48 per share. The final share price for the IPO launch was issued on July 7, 2010. This record has since been beaten by another Chinese company, Alibaba, in 2014.

ABC raised US$19.21 billion in an IPO in Hong Kong and Shanghai on July 6, 2010, before overallotment options were exercised. On August 13, 2010, ABC officially completed the world's largest initial public offering, raising a total of  after both Shanghai and Hong Kong's over-allotments were fully exercised. The IPO was once thought to be able to raise , but weaker market sentiment dampened the value. Despite a 15-month low for the Chinese benchmark index, the IPO was said to have gone smoothly.

CICC, Goldman Sachs, and Morgan Stanley led the Hong Kong offering, with JPMorgan, Macquarie, Deutsche Bank and ABC's own securities unit also involved. CICC, CITIC Securities, Galaxy and Guotai Junan Securities handled the Shanghai portion. ABC sold about 40% of the Shanghai offering to 27 strategic investors, including China Life Insurance and China State Construction. They were subject to lock-up periods of 12–18 months. Eleven cornerstone investors were selected for its Hong Kong share offering, including Qatar Investment Authority and Kuwait Investment Authority, taking a combined  worth of shares.

See also

Asset management in China
Banking in China
Policy banks
List of banks in China
List of companies of China

References

External links
 
 

 

 
Companies listed on the Shanghai Stock Exchange
Companies listed on the Hong Kong Stock Exchange
Companies in the CSI 100 Index
Chinese brands
Government-owned companies of China
Banks established in 1949
1949 establishments in China
Companies based in Beijing
H shares
Systemically important financial institutions
2010 initial public offerings